Sergei Yuryevich Stepanchenko (born June 18, 1959 in Tatarsk, Novosibirsk Oblast) is a Soviet and Russian theater and film actor, film director. People's Artist of the Russian Federation (2005).

Selected filmography 
 Katala (1989)  as Lola's lover, police officer
 Crazies (1991)  as Fyodor
 Dreams of Russia (1992)  as Boris, Yakov Nevidimov's servant
 Prediction (1993)  as taxi driver
 Life and Extraordinary Adventures of Private Ivan Chonkin (1994)  as Plechevoy
 Hello, Fools! (1996)  as Stepan, bodyguard
 Schizophrenia (1997)  as Ensign Kravchuk
 Contract with Death (1998)  as Sergey 
 Composition for Victory Day (1998)  as Mikhalych
 Burnt by the Sun 2: The Citadel (2011)  as lorry driver
 Kidnapping, Caucasian Style! (2014)   as the 'Pro'
 Tobol (2019)  as Ensign Kravchuk
 The Twelve Chairs (2021)  as  Father Fyodor

References

External links 
 

1959 births
Living people
Russian male film actors
Soviet male film actors
Russian male stage actors
Soviet male stage actors
Russian male television actors
Russian male voice actors
People's Artists of Russia
Honored Artists of the Russian Federation
20th-century Russian male actors
21st-century Russian male actors
People from Tatarsky District